is a Japanese retired sprinter. She competed in the 4 × 100 metres relay at the 1997 World Championships, 1999 World Championships and 2003 World Championships. She was also the reserve relay member at the 1991 World Championships. She held the national record (11.56 seconds and 11.42 seconds), national university record (11.56 seconds) and national junior high school record (12.12 seconds) in the 100 metres.

Personal bests

International competition

National titles
Japanese Championships
100 m: 1997, 2004

References

External links

Kaori Sakagami at JAAF  (archived)
Kaori Sakagami at JRPO 

1974 births
Living people
Japanese female sprinters
Sportspeople from Fukui Prefecture
World Athletics Championships athletes for Japan
Athletes (track and field) at the 2002 Asian Games
Competitors at the 1995 Summer Universiade
Asian Games competitors for Japan